The Man-Kzin Wars is a series of military science fiction anthologies and is the name of the first. The short stories detail the eponymous conflicts between mankind and the Kzinti, set in Larry Niven's Known Space universe. However, Niven himself has written only a small number of the stories; most were written by other science fiction writers, as Niven opened this part of the Known Space to collaboration in the form of a shared universe. The cover art for the books in the series is created by Stephen Hickman.

Origins
The first story set in the Man-Kzin Wars, "The Warriors" (1966), was one of Niven's earliest published stories and one of the first of what would become his Known Space series. Niven did not consider himself qualified to write war stories; therefore, although a number of his later stories referenced the Man-Kzin Wars, he never actually showed them. However, there was a large fan demand for stories covering the conflict, and a number of his author friends had shown interest in writing tales set in the time frame. Niven, therefore, allowed the Man-Kzin Wars to become a shared universe, starting with the 1988 release of The Man-Kzin Wars. Starting with volume three, Niven himself has composed several additional stories in the series, although the majority of content has been written by other authors. The resulting series has also been described as a "franchise".

Initially, there were only plans for two volumes. Niven, along with John Hewitt (one of the main writers for the Ringworld RPG) composed a "Bible" for aspiring writers, including several pages of notes composed between the two of them and photocopied pages of the RPG. The Bible included corrections for some of the inconsistencies in Niven's work. Jerry Pournelle and Poul Anderson were among the first authors approached, and both ended up writing stories.

The series has continued to the current day (volume XV was released in 2019).

The stories

† Additional Notes:
"Iron" and "Inconstant Star" were combined as a single collection, Inconstant Star, in 1991.
"Cathouse" and "Briar Patch" were combined as a single collection, Cathouse, in 1990.
"The Children's Hour" and "The Asteroid Queen" were combined as a single collection, The Children's Hour, in 1991.
"A Darker Geometry" was expanded (an extra segment added to the end) and republished as a novel in 1996.
"The Warriors," "Madness Has its Place," "The Man Who Would Be Kzin," and "In the Hall of the Mountain King" were collected as The Best of All Possible Wars: The Best of the Man-Kzin Wars in 1998.
"Cathouse," "Briar Patch," and "The Children's Hour" were collected as The Houses of the Kzinti in 2002.
"Jotok" was originally called "The Chosen One."
In 2001, Annals of the Man-Kzin-Wars: An Unofficial Companion Guide was released. Written by Alan Michaud, it included illustrations, maps, histories of the Kzinti and humans, character biographies, and story descriptions. It covered the first eight volumes.
Destiny's Forge is a single novel.
Treasure Planet is a single novel.
Freedom is a single novel.

Volumes

Plot summary
There are a total of four Man-Kzin Wars, as well as major and minor "Kzinti incidents". The First War began circa 2367. By this time, Human space was in the middle of the "Long Peace". ARM, the United Nations security forces, has completely suppressed all "dangerous" technologies, histories, mental illnesses, and media, leading to not only an end of the war and almost all violent crimes, but a change in society so vast that most people have a difficulty even conceptualizing such things.

The U.N.'s reach was limited to Earth, however. There were a number of other colonies in space, the most important being the Asteroid Belt, Wunderland, We Made It, Jinx, and Plateau.

First Man-Kzin War
The Kzinti, with vast technical superiority (including gravity drives, telepaths, and a large military empire), detected a human colonization ship in deep space, the Angel's Pencil. After the Kzin telepath learned that the humans were unarmed and didn't even understand the concept of weapons, they attempted to kill the human crew in a slow, painful manner using an inductive heating weapon hoping to capture their ship intact for intelligence purposes. However, one of the humans used the ship's powerful drive system (which doubled as an interstellar communications laser) as a weapon and destroyed the Kzin ship, beginning the First Man-Kzin War. The crew then warned Earth of the warlike aliens, although the transmissions were initially dismissed as an outbreak of psychosis. Then a similar encounter between another human ship and the Kzin vessel led to the destruction of the more primitive human ship. However, one of the human prisoners, with the aid of a rogue telepath, was able to escape to the Angel's Pencil and warn them of the danger of their increasing penetration into Kzinti space.

In the course of the First Man-Kzin War, the Kzinti invaded and occupied the human colony of Wunderland, in the Alpha Centauri system, as a staging point for an attack on Earth. Human ships attempting to escape back to Earth were shot down, but a single vessel managed to carry some refugees to the sister colony We Made It. The Kzinti fleet moved on to Earth, but in a replay of first contact, the peaceful humans used laser communications, fusion drives, and mass drivers to cut the first invasion fleet to ribbons. Over the next several decades, three more fleets were launched against Earth, and all were beaten back. However, after near defeat by the fourth fleet, it was becoming clear to Earth's military leaders that the Kzinti were learning to wage war more effectively than their traditional "scream and leap" tactics, and that the Solar system's defenses would quickly succumb to the Kzinti's superior numbers, firepower, and technology, were it only wielded with a modicum of tactical and strategic sense. In order to delay the next attack, a Terran Bussard ramjet starship was utilized to transport and deploy several relativistic kill vehicles in the Wunderland system. Using iron slugs accelerated to 99% of the speed of light, it devastated a portion of the planet, killing humans and Kzinti alike and delaying the launch of yet another Kzin fleet against Earth. A number of specialists traveled aboard this ship, using Slaver stasis fields for lithobraking, and successfully assassinated the Kzin military leader on Wunderland, Chuut-Riit. Despite this setback for the Kzin cause, preparations for a fifth and decisive assault fleet were nearing completion.

At this point, a passing Outsider ship sold the colony of We Made It the manual for a hyperdrive, a technology unknown to the Kzinti. Dimity Carmody, an escapee from Wunderland and a genius who had toyed with FTL drive concepts before the occupation, managed to construct a working prototype drive using the manual. Hyperdrive ships were dispatched to Earth, where the faster-than-light drive was installed on several ships for a preemptive attack on the Fifth Invasion fleet. The attack hit the Kzin amidst internal struggles following the death of their leader. Due to the huge success, Wunderland was quickly liberated, freeing the fleet to attack other Kzinti worlds. The FTL drive allowed the human fleets to coordinate and concentrate their forces beyond anything the Kzinti could manage, even letting them outrun and jam the news of each successive Kzin defeat. The first indication the Kzinti Patriarchy had that much of the Kzin empire was gone and that a significant percentage of all Kzinti had died was when human warships appeared in the skies above their homeworld.

Meanwhile, however, on Wunderland, now liberated by humans, several surviving Kzin, led by Vaemar-Riit, the last surviving kitten of Chuut-Riit, and with the cooperation of Dimity Carmody, Nils Rykermann, Leonie Rykermann, and other humans began to cautiously cooperate with humans and try to learn human ways. Vaemar-Riit even enrolled at a human university and obtained a reserve officer's commission. These became known as the Wunderkzin, and some later proved to be human allies. This slowly growing Man-Kzin cooperation was bitterly opposed both by many other Kzin and by many revanchist humans on Wunderland, while others among the human and kzin communities on Wunderland sought to manipulate the situation for their own ends. There were also ongoing human situations - for example, Nils Rykermann, a Wunderland academic, in love with Dimity Carmody, married Leonie Rykermann, one of his students, during the occupation, believing Dimity to be dead. This situation has not been resolved. There was also a somewhat ambiguous growing relationship between Dimity and Vaemar-Riit; the two are depicted together on the cover of Man-Kzin Wars XI.

The war ends in 2433 with the signing of the MacDonald-Rishaii Peace Treaty. The vast majority of the Man-Kzin Wars stories are set around the First War.

"The Peace"
Following the end of hostilities, the Human forces use their hyperdrive ships to initiate a blockade of all Kzinti worlds within range of Human space. The Kzinti of both their homeworld and the prominent colony of W'kkai begin researching hyperdrive technology in an attempt to break the blockade, with the High Admiral of W'kkai also hoping to overthrow the Patriarch. Due to the treachery of Ulf Reichstein Markham, the Kzinti of Kzin gain access to hyperdrive designs and an engineer familiar with them in 2438. During this time, the Kdaptist religion spreads among the Kzinti.

On Wunderland, an attempt is made to form a stable, democratic government. On Earth, although no one seriously believes the Kzin will stay away, the ARM returns to its old habits of trying to eliminate all knowledge and technology of war. We Made It continues to create hyperdrives, as the Human military forces attempt to reverse-engineer Kzinti gravity technology. They also attempt to locate and form an anti-Kzin alliance with the Pierin aliens (although according to the Ringworld RPG, the Pierin may already be enslaved at this point).

A troika of unconventional officers – Belter General Lucas Fry, flatlander Major Yankee Clandeboye, and Wunderlander Admiral Blumenhandler – established a semi-covert training center on Barnard's Starbase. There the troika develops plans for fighting the hyperdrive-equipped Kzinti in a coming second war. The new plans are needed since the (mostly successful) human tactics in the first were restricted by their own ignorance, and by the ARM's structure: The only successful other planetary assaults the liberation of Wunderland, only two, on Down and Hssin.

The group devises two ways to help prepare the rest of the human military: A war game called Trolls and Bridges, and a book, The Heroic Myth of Lieutenant Nora Argamentine. Written by Clandeboye, they are a fictionalized account of the diary of his cousin, Nora Argamentine. She was a U.N. officer caught by Kzinti, who later rebelled against them before being gradually lobotomized. The book becomes extremely popular and helps raise morale, as well as cultivating the belief that the Kzin will attack again.

Second Man-Kzin War
All information on the second war comes from the Ringworld RPG guidebook. It begins in 2449 when the Kzinti launch "diversionary raids" on Sigma Draconis and Barnard's Star (which can probably be retconned to be due to Barnard's Starbase from The Heroic Myth of Lieutenant Nora Argamentine) and ends in 2475 with the liberation of the Kdatlyno from Kzin rule.

Third Man-Kzin War
The Third War is mentioned in the Ringworld RPG and The Ringworld Engineers. According to the Known Space novel Juggler of Worlds, it started in 2490.

At the end of the war, the Wunderland Treatymaker weapon is used on the Kzinti fortress-world of Warhead, creating a huge, habitable canyon on the otherwise Mars-like world. Warhead is annexed by the humans and renamed Canyon. This war is chronicled in considerable detail in the novel Destiny's Forge.

Fourth Man-Kzin War
The war begins on an unknown date, with Kzinti suicide attacks on Epsilon Eridani. During the war, human adventurers engage in similar suicide attacks on Kzinti harems. The war ends in 2505 with the signing of the Covenants of Shasht, named after a Kzinti world which is annexed by Humans and later renamed Fafnir. The Kzinti are disarmed and restricted to police weapons only.  This restriction was still in effect as late as 2657, as specified in The Soft Weapon.

Aftermath
Over the next decades and centuries, some Kzinti dream of another war, and go to great lengths (such as piracy, seeking Slaver stasis boxes, and going to Ringworld) in an attempt to gain enough of an upper hand to begin one. There is at least one "major incident" after the Fourth War, which some humans describe as another "war" (see Flatlander). The surviving Kzinti finally faced the reality that another all-out war would bring no benefit.

In the events of Ringworld, Nessus inadvertently reveals to Wu and Speaker-to-Animals that the Man-Kzin Wars were engineered by the Puppeteers. The Puppeteers viewed the Kzin as too dangerous and hoped a series of wars in which successive generations of the most aggressive Kzinti males were selectively killed off by humans would help breed reason into the Kzinti as the preferred alternative over outright extermination. To that end, the Puppeteers used a starseed lure on Procyon to ensure that the Outsiders would equip mankind with hyperdrives, knowing that it would be the tool that would allow victory for humans.

Recurring characters 
 Chuut-Riit — Leader of the Kzinti conquest forces occupying Wunderland.
 Buford Early — ARM general known for unorthodox tactics.
 Ulf Reichstein-Markham — Wunderland resistance leader and, eventually, traitor.
 Dimity Carmody — Interpreter of the alien hyperdrive manual.
 Nils Rykermann — Biologist on Wunderland, later resistance leader, later Wunderland politician.
 Rarrgh — Kzin soldier, later protector of Vaemar-Riit, later seneschal of Vaemar-Riit's palace.
 Leonie Rykermann — Wife of Nils Rykermann.
 Vaemar-Riit — Son of Chuut-Riit. Leader of the "Wunderkzin".
 Arthur Guthlac — Originally an Earth museum guard and illegal collector of forbidden militaria, later brigadier on UNSN General Staff.

Reception 
The series has been described as one of the better-known works related to the theme of armed conflict in science fiction.

Canonicity

Larry Niven has never specifically addressed whether or not these stories are part of the canon of Known Space stories. He has ruled A Darker Geometry as definitely non-canonical, and the story is incompatible with Juggler of Worlds, which is co-authored by Niven and Edward M.  Lerner. Conversely, Niven's story Fly-By-Night refers directly to, and summarizes, the events of Telepath's Dance, so it appears he considers that story canonical. The canonicity of other stories in the series is undetermined.

Many of the stories in the series have added details to Known Space and its history, details which may be incompatible with older stories in the canon (in particular, those written by Niven long before the Man-Kzin Wars series was published). The protagonist in Matthew Joseph Harrington's Teacher's Pet from Man-Kzin Wars XI, who has become a protector after landing on Home while fleeing from Kzinti, deduces several things that (at least at first glance) seem to be at odds with accepted canon - for example, that Puppeteers had been manipulating both humanity and the Kzin far more than anyone had previously thought.

In other cases, stories clearly contradict established canon. For example, various MKW stories state that Kzinti did not establish their own interstellar empire nor invent their own spacefaring technology. Instead, primitive Kzinti warriors were hired as mercenaries by the Jotoki, a species of interstellar traders, whom the Kzinti later overthrew and enslaved.

Yet, Niven's "The Soft Weapon" states:

There had been a time, between the discoveries of atomic power and the gravity polarizer, when it seemed the Kzinti species would destroy itself in wars. Now the Kzinti held many worlds, and the danger was past.

However, "Jotok" suggests a possible compromise scenario. In that story, primitive Kzinti clans on the Kzin homeworld are being marginalized by advanced Kzinti who use atomic power and gravity polarizer-driven spacecraft. It is the primitives who are hired by the Jotoki, to use as mercenaries against the more advanced Kzinti.

References

External links
Timeline of the Known Space universe

Fiction set around 61 Ursae Majoris
Known Space stories
Military science fiction
Science fiction anthology series
Works by Larry Niven
1988 anthologies
1989 anthologies
1990 anthologies
1991 anthologies
1992 anthologies
1994 anthologies
1995 anthologies
1996 anthologies
1998 anthologies
2002 anthologies
2003 anthologies
2005 anthologies
2007 anthologies
2009 anthologies
Fiction about space warfare
Shared universes